Boyce Logan Wilkins (August 14, 1946 – August 6, 2022), better known as Butch Wilkins, was an American politician and a Democratic member of the Arkansas House of Representatives representing District 59 fromn 2013 to 2015. Wilkins also served from January 2009 until January 2013 in the District 74 House seat. He was also an officer with the Arkansas Game and Fish Commission. Wilkins was born on August 14, 1946. He died from surgical complications on August 6, 2022, at the age of 75.

Elections
2012 Redistricted to District 59, and with Representative Josh Johnston leaving the Legislature, Wilkins was unopposed for the May 22, 2012 Democratic Primary and won the November 6, 2012 General election with 4,390 votes (53.7%) against Republican nominee John Cooper, who in 2014 won a special election to the Arkansas State Senate in District 21 to succeed  Democrat Paul Bookout, who was forced from office in scandal.
2008 Initially in District 74, when Representative Chris Thyer left the Legislature and left the seat open, Wilkins won the May 20, 2008 Democratic Primary with 1,104 votes (61.6%) over Mall operator Jason Whitley, and was unopposed for the November 4, 2008 General election.
2010 Wilkins was unopposed for both the May 18, 2010 Democratic Primary and the November 2, 2010 General election.

References

External links
Official page at the Arkansas House of Representatives

Butch Wilkins at Ballotpedia
Butch Wilkins at the National Institute on Money in State Politics

1946 births
Place of birth missing
2022 deaths
21st-century American politicians
Democratic Party members of the Arkansas House of Representatives
People from Craighead County, Arkansas